Brundage Mountain Resort is an alpine ski area in the western United States, located in west central Idaho in the Payette National Forest.

The summit of Brundage Mountain straddles the county line with Valley County to the east, in which McCall lies.

The two-day trip spends the night in a mountain yurt. These areas are among the highest average snowfalls 

History
In the late 1950s, alpine skiers in the McCall area had just the Little Ski Hill, with its modest  vertical drop.  Bogus Basin near Boise was over three hours away (in good conditions) by vehicle, and Sun Valley was considerably farther.  One of these McCall skiers was Boise agribusiness tycoon J.R. Simplot (1909–2008), who had a vacation home on Payette Lake.

Financed by Simplot, the Brundage Mountain project took shape under the guidance of longtime McCall resident, Warren Brown (1912–2000) and ski legend Corey Engen (1916–2006). A former Olympian and instructor at the Little Ski Hill, Engen laid out the trails on the mountain during the summer of 1961. Favorable snowfall allowed Brundage to open on Thanksgiving on November 23, with a double chairlift, T-bar, and a rope tow. The lift tickets were priced at a then-lofty five dollars, similar to Sun Valley's rates; Engen stayed on as resort manager until 1970. The original A-frame lodge was expanded with a two-story addition in the fall of 1971, and lift tickets went up fifty cents, to $5.50.

A second double chairlift, Brundage Creek, was added in 1976, in parallel with the original Pioneer.  The Centennial triple chairlift was added in 1990 to the southern edge of the terrain, which increased the area's terrain by 30% and added  of vertical drop by lowering the base. The Easy Street chairlift was installed at the beginner area in 1994, adding a lower parking lot at its base. The parallel double chairlifts were replaced  in the summer of 1997 by a single high-speed detachable quad, the Blue Bird Express, which ascended to the summit in a rapid seven minutes.

In April 2006, the J.R. Simplot Company sold its 50% interest in Brundage Mountain to the ski area's long-time co-owner, the DeBoer family. (Diane (Brown) DeBoer is the daughter of co-founder Warren Brown.) That August, a long-anticipated land trade with U.S. Forest Service was completed. It gave Brundage Mountain the ownership of  around its base area, allowing the opportunity for future resort development.  In return, the USFS gained important private in-holdings in the Payette National Forest.

In 2007, Brundage invested more than $3 million to install two new fixed-grip triple chairlifts, Lakeview and The Bear. The Lakeview lift opened up  of south-facing terrain, with sweeping views of Payette Lake, McCall, and Valley County.  The Bear connects the Centennial base area to a ridge above the main base area.  A platter lift which served the expert Race Course and easier runs was removed. A small lodge, The Bear Den, was added at the top of the lift. Excluding the Easy Street chair, total uphill capacity for the area was increased from 3,100 to 6,700 riders per hour.

Future
Future expansion plans at Brundage Mountain include a chairlift to the north, serving the  summit of Sargent's Mountain (formerly known as "Brundage Mountain").  The new chair will open new expert terrain and reach  higher than the present summit, the top of the Blue Bird Express quad.

The owners of Brundage Mountain have also received approval from Adams County for a PUD on the private land in the base area. That will allow for future construction of ski-in/ski-out lodging and expanded base area facilities.

Lift statistics

The mountain bluebird is the state bird of Idaho
Idaho celebrated its centennial of statehood in 1990

U.S. Ski Team
 Patty Boydstun-Hovdey - World Cup and Olympic alpine racer
 1970 U.S. slalom champion - 8th in slalom at 1972 Winter Olympics

References

External links
 
 McCall Magazine – The History of Brundage Mountain Resort – Winter/Spring 2007 
 Visit Idaho.org – official state tourism site – Brundage Mountain
 Ski Lifts.org – photos of Brundage Mountain's lifts
Ski Map.org – vintage maps – Brundage Mountain
 Idaho Ski resorts.com  – Brundage Mountain

Ski areas and resorts in Idaho
Mountains of Adams County, Idaho
Mountains of Valley County, Idaho
Mountains of Idaho
Mountain biking venues in the United States
Buildings and structures in Adams County, Idaho
Buildings and structures in Valley County, Idaho
Tourist attractions in Adams County, Idaho
Tourist attractions in Valley County, Idaho
Payette National Forest